Mark Richard David Seaward (born 10 August 1938) is a British ecologist and lichenologist. He was awarded the Acharius Medal in 2006 for lifetime contributions to lichenology.

Life and career
Seaward was born in Lincoln, England. He attended the University of Birmingham, graduating in 1959, and obtained an education diploma from the same institution a year later. While teaching at the Loughborough Training College, he obtained an MSc from the University of Nottingham in 1965. In 1967 he moved on to Trinity and All Saints College. Seaward earned a PhD from the University of Bradford in 1972. His thesis was about urban lichen ecology. He started employment at that university in 1974. In 1989 he was appointed as chair of Professor of Environmental Biology. He has continued as an honorary research professor since his retirement.

Recognition
The genus Seawardiella honours Seaward. Species that have been named after him include: Granulopyrenis seawardii ; Ramalina seawardii ; Enterographa seawardii ; Dolichocarpus seawardii ; Caloplaca seawardii ; and Graphis seawardii .

Selected publications

References

1938 births
Living people
British ecologists
British lichenologists
Alumni of the University of Bradford
Academics of the University of Bradford
Alumni of the University of Nottingham
People from Lincoln, England
Acharius Medal recipients
20th-century British scientists
21st-century British scientists